Zarck Visser (born 15 September 1989) is a South African athlete specialising in the long jump. He won silver medal at the 2014 Commonwealth Games, as well as two medals at the African Championships.

His personal bests in the event are 8.41 metres outdoors (Bad Langensalza 2015) and 7.93 metres indoors (Sopot 2014).

Competition record

References

1989 births
Living people
South African Christians
South African male long jumpers
Athletes (track and field) at the 2014 Commonwealth Games
Commonwealth Games silver medallists for South Africa
Commonwealth Games medallists in athletics
World Athletics Championships athletes for South Africa
Athletes (track and field) at the 2016 Summer Olympics
Olympic athletes of South Africa
20th-century South African people
21st-century South African people
Medallists at the 2014 Commonwealth Games